Antares has been launched a total of 17 times since April 2013. All of the launches have been successful, except for Cygnus CRS Orb-3.

About the Antares 
Antares, known during early development as Taurus II, is an expendable launch system developed by Orbital Sciences Corporation (now part of Northrop Grumman) and the Pivdenne Design Bureau to launch the Cygnus spacecraft to the International Space Station as part of NASA's COTS and CRS programs. Able to launch payloads heavier than  into low Earth orbit, Antares is currently the largest rocket operated by Northrop Grumman. Antares launches from the Mid-Atlantic Regional Spaceport and made its inaugural flight on April 21, 2013.

NASA awarded Orbital a Commercial Orbital Transportation Services (COTS) Space Act Agreement (SAA) in 2008 to demonstrate delivery of cargo to the International Space Station. For these COTS missions Orbital intends to use Antares to launch its Cygnus spacecraft. In addition, Antares will compete for small-to-medium missions. Originally designated the Taurus II, Orbital Sciences renamed the vehicle Antares, after the star of the same name, on December 12, 2011.

Out of 17 total launches, Antares has suffered one failure. During the fifth launch on October 28, 2014, the rocket failed catastrophically, and the vehicle and payload were destroyed. The rocket's first-stage engines were identified as the cause for the failure. A different engine was chosen for subsequent launches, and the rocket had a successful return to flight on October 17, 2016.

The Antares has flown two major design iterations, the 100 series and 200 series. Both series have used a Castor 30XL as an upper stage but have differed on the first stage. The 100 series used two Kerolox powered AJ26 engine in the first stage and launched successfully four times. The 100 series was retired following a launch failure in 2014. The 200 series which first flew in 2016 also featured a Kerolox first stage but instead used two RD-181 engine along with other minor upgrades. The 200 series future became uncertain following the Russian invasion of Ukraine. Due to the first stage being produced in Ukraine and the engines in Russia, future production of the rocket was unable to be continued. As a result Northrop Grumman entered into an agreement with Firefly Aerospace to build the first stage of the Antares 300 series. Northrop also contracted with SpaceX for 3 Falcon 9 launches.

Launch statistics

Rocket configurations

Launch outcomes

Launch contractor

Past launches 

Note: Cygnus CRS OA-4, the first Enhanced Cygnus mission, and Cygnus OA-6 were propelled by Atlas V 401 launch vehicles while the new Antares 230 was in its final stages of development. Cygnus CRS OA-7 was also switched to an Atlas V 401 and launched on April 18, 2017

Future launches

References 

Antares (rocket family)
Antares